Play Gaelic is the first album by the Scottish Celtic rock band Runrig. It was released in 1978 on LP and tape by Neptune Records.
In 1990 it was re-released on CD by Lismor Recordings with different cover art.

Style

The band's sound on the album is half way between traditional ceilidh music and pastoral folk as opposed to the harder rock edge which would characterise the next album The Highland Connection. Several of the songs are now part of the Gaelic songbook, "Tillidh Mi" is a fixture at Feisean, "Cum 'ur n'Aire" is a favourite at the Royal National Mòd and "Chì Mi'n Geamhradh" has acted as a Cathy Anne MacPhee album title as well as being re-interpreted by Niteworks, an electronica band from Skye in 2011.

The album, and the song "Dùisg Mo Rùn", were featured in the second episode of Can Seo, a programme for Gaelic learners that started on BBC One Scotland in 1979.

Track listing
 "Dùisg Mo Rùn" (Wake Up My Love) – 3:50
 "Sguaban Arbhair" (The Sheaves of Corn) – 4:12
 "Tillidh Mi" (I Will Return) – 3:40
 "Griogal Cridhe" (Beloved Gregor) – 4:44
 "Nach Neònach Neisd A Tha E" (Isn't It Strange Now) – 4:06
 "Sunndach" (Joyous) – 3:54
 "Air an Tràigh" (On the Strand) – 2:49
 "Dè Nì Mi / Puirt" (What Will I Do / Tunes) – 2:56
 "An Ròs" (The Rose) – 4:04
 "Ceòl an Dannsa" (Dancing Music) – 2:42
The Brolum
Irish Reel
Reel of Tulloch
 "Chì Mi 'n Geamhradh" (I See the Winter) – 5:22
 "Cum Ur n-Aire" (Keep in Mind) – 6:15

Personnel
Runrig
Calum Macdonald - drums, percussion
Robert Macdonald - accordion
Rory Macdonald - vocals, guitars
Donnie Munro - lead vocals, twelve-string guitar

1978 debut albums
Runrig albums
Scottish Gaelic music